Lahbab, also spelled Lehbab, is a village in the Emirate of Dubai, about 50 km south of Dubai city.  

It is situated on the highway between Dubai and the border of the Emirate of Sharjah.  

It has a population of approximately 1,001 people. The village residents are wealthy Bedouins that are close friends to the royal family of Dubai. 

The main activity is camel breeding and raising. There is a large camel race track located there.

References

Populated places in Dubai